Stefan Todorov (born 9 October 1982) is a Bulgarian footballer (striker) playing currently for Unia Janikowo. He joined that club from Wisła Płock, where he could not get to the first squad. Todorov started his career in CSKA Sofia. In the winter break 2006/2007 he was released free from Unia.

Clubs 
  CSKA Sofia
  Akademik Svishtov
 ?–2004  PFC Spartak Pleven
 2004   Belite Orli Pleven
 2004   Slavia Sofia
 2004–05  PFC Belasitsa Petrich
 2006   Wisła Płock
 2006  Unia Janikowo
 2007–?

External links
 

Bulgarian footballers
Unia Janikowo players
PFC Belasitsa Petrich players
First Professional Football League (Bulgaria) players
1982 births
Living people
Expatriate footballers in Poland
Bulgarian expatriate sportspeople in Poland
Association football forwards